Claudius Bombarnac (1893) is an adventure novel written by Jules Verne.

Plot 
Claudius Bombarnac, a reporter is assigned by the Twentieth Century to cover the travels of the Grand Transasiatic Railway which runs between Uzun Ada, a harbour on the eastern coast of the Caspian Sea, and Peking, China. Accompanying him on this journey is an interesting collection of characters, including one who is trying to beat the round the world record and another who is a stowaway. Claudius hopes one of them will become the hero of his piece, so his story won't be just a boring travelogue. He is not disappointed when a special car guarded by troops is added to the train, said to be carrying the remains of a great Mandarin. The great Mandarin actually turns out to be a large consignment being returned to China from Persia. Unfortunately the train must travel through a large part of China that is controlled by unscrupulous robber-chiefs. Before the journey is over, Claudius finds his hero.

English titles
In addition to Claudius Bombarnac, the novel has been published under several different English titles:
 The Special Correspondent
 The Adventures of a Special Correspondent
 The Adventures of a Special Correspondent in Central Asia
 Claudius Bombarnac: Special Correspondent

Publication history
1894, UK, London: Sampson Low. 279 pp., First UK edition
1894, US, New York:  Lovell, Coryell and Co., 279 pp., First United States edition, as The Special Correspondent, or The Adventures of Claudius Bombarnac

References

External links
 
 Claudius Bombarnac  available at Jules Verne Collection  

1893 French novels
1893 science fiction novels
Novels by Jules Verne
Novels about journalists
Novels set in Asia
Novels set in China